Magnar Lund Bergo (born 27 February 1949, in Oslo) is a Norwegian politician for the Socialist Left Party (SV). He was elected to the Norwegian Parliament from Buskerud in 2001.

Parliamentary Committee duties
2005 – 2009 member of the Standing Committee on Finance and Economic Affairs.
2001 – 2005 member of the Standing Committee on Family and Cultural Affairs.

External links

1949 births
Living people
Socialist Left Party (Norway) politicians
Members of the Storting
21st-century Norwegian politicians